Peter James Welsh (24 January 1954 – 18 July 2008) was an Australian rules footballer who played for Hawthorn and Richmond in the Victorian Football League (VFL).

A utility player who was used mainly in the back pocket, Welsh started his VFL career in 1973 with Hawthorn and played in their 1975 Grand Final loss to North Melbourne. He crossed to Richmond in 1980 and was a member of their side which won the premiership that season. Welsh was on occasions pushed forward and kicked 22 goals in 1981.

Welsh died on 18 July 2008 after a long illness. He was the son of Collingwood footballer Bill Welsh.

References

External links

 

1954 births
2008 deaths
Richmond Football Club players
Richmond Football Club Premiership players
Hawthorn Football Club players
Australian rules footballers from Victoria (Australia)
One-time VFL/AFL Premiership players